Forward Press (फारवर्ड प्रेस) is an English-Hindi bilingual monthly magazine covering issues relevant to India's backward classes (the masses) and regions. The editor-in-chief is Ivan Kostka.  Its management decided to suspend its print edition from June 2016 and convert itself to a web-only publication.

Overview 
Forward Press was started by Silvia Maria Fernandes Kostka and Ivan Kostka in 2009 in New Delhi. It has appointed many correspondents from several states and cities. It launched the Bahujan Sahitya Catalogue.

Controversy 
The magazine in one of its  issues published an article which was alleged to be  derogatory to Hindu Goddess Durga by some student organizations having political association while another group of students mostly associated with All India Backward Student Federation, a student union comprising members belonging to Backward Castes and Dalit communities organised 'Mahisasura Sahadat Diwas' at Jawaharlal Nehru University being inspired by the issue which prompted the Delhi Police to raid its office on a complaint filed by right-wing student unions of Jawaharlal Nehru University.

See also
 Pramod Ranjan
 Gail Omvedt

References

External links
 Official website

2009 establishments in Delhi
2016 disestablishments in India
Dalit culture
Defunct magazines published in India
Defunct political magazines
English-language magazines published in India
Hindi-language magazines
Magazines established in 2009
Magazines disestablished in 2016
Magazines published in Delhi
Monthly magazines published in India
Online magazines with defunct print editions
Online magazines published in India
Political magazines published in India